The de Steiger family (or de Steiguer, von Steiger, von Steiguer) was a Bernese patrician family of the Swiss ancien régime.

Origins
The origin of the family dates back to Johannes Steiger (1523 - 1577), a tailor in Bern, Switzerland. They would become known as the "black" Steigers, not to be confused with the "white" Steigers, because their coat of arms depicted a black ibex. Because of French influence in the Bernese patriciate, the name is also spelled de Steiguer.  The predicate "von"
is used in the German presentation of the family name.

Government service
Johannes's sons would serve on the Bernese councils, paving the way for future generations to serve in the government.  By 1796, they held 22 seats on various councils throughout Bern. Over time they contributed three avoyers, five treasurers, and three bannerets to Bern, and numerous bailiffs, counselors, and officers.

A notable "black" de Steiger was Niklaus Friedrich von Steiger, the Schultheiss of Bern, and leader of the Bernese senate during French invasion in 1798.  Another was Sigmund Emanuel Von Steiger (1666-1725), member of the Great Council of Bern, and married to Countess Dorothia von Graffenried.

Prussian nobility
In 1714, King Frederick William I of Prussia gave the hereditary title of Baron and a coat of arms to the "black" de Steigers, including Christoph, eight de Steiger males, and their descendants.  They would have baronies in Montricher and Monnaz, in Vaud, and numerous estates in Bern.  Their coat of arms still appears today on the walls of the Château de Chillon.  Niklaus is buried in a cathedral in Bern.

Notable members
Niklaus Friedrich von Steiger (1729–1799), Swiss politician
Johann Rudolf de Steiger  (1778–1834), Swiss-American colonist
Edmund von Steiger (1836–1908), Swiss clergyman and politician
Eduard von Steiger (1881–1962), Swiss politician
Louis R. de Steiguer (1867–1947), American Naval officer

Notes

References

 Historisch-Biographisches Lexikon der Schweiz, Volume VI. Neuenburg. 1921-1934.
 "Steiger Family Patent of Nobility." Frederick William I of Prussia.
 Almanach Geologique Suisse, Volume II.
 Ruvigny, Melville H. "The Nobilities of Europe".  Adamant Media Corporation. 2000. , 
 Hintze, Rhett. Family History of de Steiguer (Steiger) Family: From Johann Rudolf back 500 years. Unknown.  14 dec 2008
 Hintze, Rhett.  de Steiger Pictures.  Unknown. 14 dec 2008
 Schemmel, B. "Cantons A-F: Switzerland." 1995-1998. dec 14 2008.
 Schemmel, B. "Index of Rulers: St-Sz" 1995-1998. dec 14 2008.
 "The history of the invasion of Switzerland by the French, and the destruction of the democratical republics of Schwitz, Uri and Unterwalden." University of Toronto. Unknown. 14 dec 2008

Surnames
Families of Bern
Swiss noble families